Jung Eun-chae (born Jung Sol-mi on November 24, 1986) is a South Korean actress, model and TV host. Jung began her career as a model, then made her acting breakthrough as the titular character in Nobody's Daughter Haewon (2013), a film by auteur Hong Sang-soo that premiered at the 63rd Berlin International Film Festival.

In 2013, she released an EP of indie folk songs she composed herself, the self-titled Jung Eun-chae.

Early life
Jung Eun-chae spent 8 years living in London, starting from middle school senior year when she was 15-year-old. Due to the influence of her older brother who works at a production company, Chorokbaem Media, Jung became interested in pursuing an acting career after she returned to South Korea.

Career
Jung Eun-chae debuted as a commercial model. A string of memorable commercials has earned her a CF Model of the Year title at the 2011 6th Asia Model Festival Awards. She uses a stage name instead of her real name "Jung Sol-mi" because of the similarity with a veteran actress Park Sol-mi. Jung made her acting debut after passing the audition for the supernatural thriller film Haunters.

Since then, Jung has alternated between doing blockbuster films such as The Fatal Encounter, The King, The Great Battle and art films such as Nobody's Daughter Haewon, Hill of Freedom, The Table. Her breakthrough came with Nobody's Daughter Haewon, in which she received multiple of prestigious awards winning and nominations.

Jung's debut in television dramas was through the 2011 KBS1 telenovela My Bittersweet Life. Three years later, she acted in a psychological thriller series Dr. Frost. She made a big comeback to the TV drama in 2018 with two series released on the same year, SBS hit legal crime Return and OCN's The Guest, a drama that combines the elements of exorcism, shamanism, and procedural.

She was later cast as one of the main characters in the 2020 SBS TV series The King: Eternal Monarch. She gained recognition and was declared the best character according to a poll released by Cleo Singapore.

In August 2022, Jung renewed her contract with KeyEast.

Filmography

Films

Television series

Music video

Discography

Radio program

Awards and nominations

References

External links 

Jung Eun-chae on KMDb

1986 births
Living people
21st-century South Korean actresses
South Korean film actresses
South Korean television actresses
South Korean female models
People from Busan